Lake Eber is a freshwater lake in Afyon Province, Turkey.

Geography 
The lake is between the district centers of Çay, Bolvadin and Sultandağı of Afyon Province. The surface area fluctuates and at times it may be exceed .

Geology 
At the conclusion of the last glacier age (Pleistocene) a vast lake was formed in the basin. But after the water level dropped, the lake was fragmentized into two lakes. Lake Eber is at the north west and Lake Akşehir which shares the same history lies at the south east.

Tributaries 
The tributaries are rivulets from the Sultan Mountains at the south. When the level increases beyond a certain level the water is fed to the nearby lower level Akşehir lake by a channel (Eber channel).

Ecology 
The main plants of the lake are Typha latifolia, Phragmites australis, Lycopus europaeus and Mentha aquatica. The lake is known for the reed beds. Sometimes the remains of reed beds which detach from the land, constitute floating islands on the lake and may be used by the fishermen. The fish species are Cyprinus carpio, Cyprinus carpio, Esox lucius and Gobio gobio. The lake is also known for various waterfowls.

Important Bird Area status
The lake was declared by BirdLife International as an Important Bird Area in 1989 for its waterfowl species of international character and species, which are threatened by hunting, pollution and reed cutting.

Environmental issues
Due to global warming and misuse of water sources, the surface area of the lake is shrinking. The neighbouring Lake Akşehir has been mostly dried up. Up to 1992, the most important problem was water pollution. Although, the lake was declared as Natural Protected Area in 1992, it was reported that the lake had dried out completely in 2018. As of 2020, the water has been reported to be back in the lake.

References

External links 
 https://web.archive.org/web/20101121070845/http://www.guleta.com/turkey/lake/lake_eber.php

Eber
Landforms of Afyonkarahisar Province
Important Bird Areas of Turkey